Local elections were held in South Korea on 27 June 1995. It was the first election of provincial and municipal officials since the May 16 coup of 1961.

Metropolitan city mayoral elections

Seoul

Busan

Daegu

Incheon

Gwangju

Daejon

Gubernatorial elections

Gyeonggi

Gangwon

North Chungcheong

South Chungcheong

North Jeolla

South Jeolla

North Gyeongsang

South Gyeongsang

Jeju

Provincial-level council elections

Summary

Constituency seats

Proportional representation seats

Municipal-level mayoral elections

Summary

By region

Municipal-level council elections 
4,541 seats in municipal-level councils were contested by candidates who were all running as independents.

Aftermath
President Kim Young-sam's Democratic Liberal Party (DLP) won only five of the top fifteen posts. 

The main opposition, the liberal Democratic Party led by Kim Dae-jung, took control of Seoul by winning the mayoral office and 23 of the city’s 25 wards. The newly founded right-wing United Liberal Democrats, formed after Kim Jong-pil quit as leader of the DLP, won three governorships.

References

Local elections in South Korea
1995 elections in South Korea